The American daily newspaper The New York Times publishes multiple weekly list ranking the best selling books in the United States. The lists are split in three genres—fiction, nonfiction and children's books. Both the fiction and nonfiction lists are further split into multiple lists.

Fiction
The following list ranks the best selling fiction books, in the combined print and e-books category. The most frequent weekly best seller of the year is Camino Island by John Grisham with 5 weeks at the top of the list, followed by The Shack by William P. Young with 4 weeks.

Nonfiction
The following list ranks the best selling nonfiction books, in the combined print and e-books category. The most frequent weekly best seller of the year was The Glass Castle by Jeannette Walls with seven weeks at the top of the list.

See also
 Publishers Weekly list of bestselling novels in the United States in the 2010s

References

2017
.
New York Times best sellers
New York Times best sellers
New York Times best sellers